Robert Henderson Bland (10 March 1876 – 20 August 1941) was an English film actor and poet. He was active in film between 1912 and 1921. He was killed during the Blitz in August 1941.

Personal life
Bland served as a captain in the Gloucestershire Regiment during the First World War and was wounded in April 1918, having been deployed to France in July 1916.

Select filmography
From the Manger to the Cross (1912)
Mr. Gilfil's Love Story (1920)
General Post (1920)
A Cigarette-Maker's Romance (1920)
The Wife whom God Forgot (1920)
Gwyneth of the Welsh Hills (1921)

References

External links

1876 births
1941 deaths
People from Croydon
English male silent film actors
20th-century English male actors
English World War I poets
British Army personnel of World War I
Gloucestershire Regiment officers
British civilians killed in World War II
Deaths by airstrike during World War II
English Freemasons